This Is Next Year is a compilation album released July 17, 2001 by Arena Rock Recording Co.

Track listing

Disc 1
"Radio" – The Walkmen
"I've Got A Fang (Demo)" – They Might Be Giants
"Wasting In The Sun" – Folksongs For The Afterlife
"Keep Your Feelings To Yourself" – Clem Snide
"Muddy Blue" – A.M. Radio (later renamed Icewater Scandal)
"Hey Man" – Grand Mal
"Go Shopping" – The Mendoza Line
"Radiate" – Weeds Of Eden
"Awake And Under" – Calla
"She Blinded Me with Science" – Ex Models
"Twin Stars" – Bee and Flower
"Like Your Mom" – Hoagy
"Sky To Ground" – Geometry
"It's All Made Up" – Scout
"No Sleeves" – Les Savy Fav
"Artificial Light" – Rainer Maria
"Painted Flowers" – Cub Country
"New York Avenue Playground" – Cindy Wheeler
"It's Not About Love (It's About Love)" – The Seconds
"Spanish Conversation" – Hub
"Johnny Shot The Mexican" – Reverend Vince Anderson

Disc 2

"Bound For Brighter Days" – The Boggs
"Problems" – Ben Kweller
"1985" – French Kicks
"Snail" – Mink Lungs
"False Porno Alarm (Surgery Mix)" – Stereobate
"Hard To Be Easy" – Champale
"Hearts Don't Break" – Ida
"Factory Farm" – Jumbo Jets
"Three Ears" – Elk City
"Horsey" – Hem
"The Wind" – The Birdwatcher
"New York's Alright (If You Like Saxophones)" – Enon
"Down In The Mud" – Gloria Deluxe
"A Time To Be So Small" – Interpol
"Blizzard Of '77" – Nada Surf
"Kite" – Mascott
"Gin I Win" – Timesbold
"Vanish" – Black Beetle
"Cellar Door" – Laura Cantrell
"Don't Believe A Word" – Blasco
"Brooklyn" – Home
"(Untitled)"

References

External links 
Arena Rock Recording Co.

Regional music compilation albums
2001 compilation albums
Arena Rock Recording Company compilation albums
Alternative rock compilation albums